John Baxter (born November 1939, died 11 March 2020) was a former solicitor and unionist politician in Northern Ireland.

Born in Coleraine, Baxter studied at Trinity College Dublin, where he was secretary of Trinity Week, then Queen's University Belfast and Tulane University in New Orleans, before returning to Coleraine to work as a solicitor.  In 1969, he was President of Coleraine Chamber of Commerce, and from 1970 to 1972, he lectured at the New University of Ulster.

He was elected for the Ulster Unionist Party in North Antrim at the 1973 Northern Ireland Assembly election, and was appointed to the 1974 Executive as Head of the Department of Information Services.  He subsequently left politics to focus on his legal career, and is currently a member of the Law Society's Practice Advisory Service, a member of the Criminal Injuries Compensation Appeals Panel Northern Ireland, Deputy Coroner for North Antrim and a member of the Council of the University of Ulster.

References

1939 births
Living people
Academics of Ulster University
Alumni of Trinity College Dublin
Alumni of Queen's University Belfast
Members of the Northern Ireland Assembly 1973–1974
People from Coleraine, County Londonderry
Tulane University alumni
Ulster Unionist Party politicians
Executive ministers of the 1974 Northern Ireland Assembly